Binodini Girls High School is a girls high school located at Dhakuria, Kolkata, in the Indian state of West Bengal. It is affiliated  to the West Bengal Board of Secondary Education for Madhyamik Pariksha (10th Board exams) and to the West Bengal Council of Higher Secondary Education for Higher Secondary Examination (12th Board exams). The school was established in 1938.

References

External links 
 

High schools and secondary schools in West Bengal
Girls' schools in Kolkata
Educational institutions established in 1938
1938 establishments in India